Events from the year 1933 in China.

Incumbents 
President: Lin Sen
Premier: Wang Jingwei
Vice Premier: Soong Tse-ven (until November 4), Kung Hsiang-hsi (starting November 4)

Events 
January 1-May 31 - Defense of the Great Wall
January–March 22 - Fourth Encirclement Campaign against Jiangxi Soviet
February 21-March 1 - Battle of Rehe
Battle of Urumqi (1933)
May 31
Battle of Aksu (1933)
Tanggu Truce
June - Kizil massacre
July - Battle of Toksun
Battle of Sekes Tash
August 25 - 1933 Diexi earthquake
September 25 - beginning of the Fifth Encirclement Campaign against Jiangxi Soviet
September 26 - Battle of Kashgar (1933)
September 28 - Nationalists capture Lichuan from Communists.
October 9 - Failure of Communist attack on Xiaoshi.
12 November - Establishment of First East Turkestan Republic

Births 

 An Qiyuan
 Lu Gongxun
 Liu Lianman
 Grace Chang
 Wang Senhao
 Lin Wenyue

Deaths 
May 7 - Zhang Jingyao
September 21 - Deng Zhongxia

References 

 
1930s in China
Years of the 20th century in China